Reductive dehaholagenses (EC 1.97.1.8) are a group of enzymes utilized in organohalide respiring bacteria.  These enzymes are mostly attached to the periplasmic side of the cytoplasmic membrane and play a central role in energy-conserving respiratory process for organohalide respiring bacteria by reducing organohalides. During such reductive dehalogenation reaction, organohalides are used as terminal electron acceptors. They catalyze the following general reactions:

R-X + 2 e− + 2 H+ →  R-H + H-X          
X-RR-X + 2 e− + 2 H+ →  R=R + 2X−

These membrane-associated enzymes have attracted great interest for the detoxification of organohalide pollutants. Organohalide pollution is a serious global environmental issue affecting soil and groundwater; and reductive dehalogenases offer a promising natural tool for bioremediation.

Structure and mechanism
Reductive dehalogenases are related to the cobamide (or vitamin B12) family of enzymes. They contain a cobalamin at its catalytic active site, where actual reductive reaction occurs. They also harbor iron− sulfur clusters that supply the reducing equivalents. All membrane-associated dehalogenases harbor a N-terminal twin-arginine (TAT) signal sequence (RRXFXK), which is a conserved signal peptide for membrane protein translocation. Monomeric as well as dimeric forms were previously reported.

Enzymatic mechanism is still understudied; however, several studies reported various mechanisms involving an organocobalt adduct, a single-electron transfer, and a halogen–cobalt bond.

Common reductive dehalogenases studied

Reductive dehalogenases from Dehalobacter species 

 Chloroform reductive dehalogenases: TmrA and CfrA

Reductive dehalogenases from Dehalococcoides species 

 Vinyl chloride reducing VcrA
 Hexachlorobenzene degrading CbrA

Reductive dehalogenases from Desulfitobacterium species 

 Perchloroethene and trichloroethene degrading PceA

Production methods

Native enzymes 
The examples are those that can dechlorinate chloroform (TmrA), PCE (PceA), TCE (TceA), and VC (VcrA).  Purification of such enzymes in native forms are reportedly difficult; however, a few such enzymes were purified to near homogeneity. Ultracentrifugation, membrane solubilization and a series of liquid chromatography are the commonly employed techniques to the isolation and purification. A chloroform reducing dehalogenase is the latest reductive dehalogenase that was successfully produced and purified.

Heterologous expressions 
The researchers in the field had turned their interest to heterologous expression of the same enzymes due to difficulties in obtaining these enzymes in the native form. Only have recently a few recombinant reductive dehalogenases been functionally expressed, bringing the dehalogenase research into next levels. Those successful efforts facilitate further investigations on their biochemical and structural properties.

The first membrane-associated respiratory reductive dehalogenase was heterologously expressed in a soluble and active form and purified using Bacillus megaterium.

Uses in bioremediation 
In recent years, research on reductive dehalogenases have attracted great interest from both academic and industrial researchers for their potential application in bioremediation of organohalide contamination.

References 

EC 1.97.1